Amichai Chikli (born 12 September 1981) is an Israeli politician who serves as the Minister of Diaspora Affairs and the Minister for Social Equality. He served in the 24th Knesset as part of the Yamina party slate, and in the 25th Knesset as part of Likud.

Biography
Chikli was born in Jerusalem in 1981 to a Tunisian Jewish family. He is the son of Masorti Rabbi Eitan Chikli and artist Camille Chikli. After completing high school he spent a year in Ma'ayan Baruch attending the Social Leadership Institute. He then joined the Israel Defense Forces and served in the Golani Brigade and the Shayetet 13 naval unit. He subsequently studied for a bachelor's degree in security and Middle Eastern studies at the Tactical Command Academy, after which he became a company commander in Unit Egoz. After leaving the army he began studying for a master's degree in diplomacy and security at Tel Aviv University. During his studies he established the Tavor Academy for Social Leadership in Nazareth Illit in 2010.

Political career
Entering politics, Chikli was placed ninth on the New Right list for the April 2019 elections, but the party failed to win a seat. Prior to the 2021 elections he was placed fifth on the Yamina list, and was elected to the Knesset as the party won seven seats. In May 2021 he stated that he would vote against a government containing Meretz or the Joint List. After Yamina joined a coalition government that included Meretz and an Arab party, Chikli voted against the new government in its investiture vote on 13 June 2021, the only Yamina MK to do so. On 23 June 2021, it was reported that Chikli would vote in favour of most legislation proposed by the coalition government. In July 2021, he voted against the Citizenship and Entry into Israel Law that would prevent Palestinians from marrying Israelis and receiving citizenship, resulting in it failing to pass as the vote ended in a 59–59 tie.

Chikli subsequently voted against his party a total of 754 times, regularly assisting the opposition. On 25 April 2022, a Knesset committee voted 7–0 in favour of a request from Yamina to declare him a "retiree" (no longer part of the party). He was then legally declared a "retiree", meaning he cannot run in the next Knesset elections as part of a faction from the current Knesset, but only in a new party. However, Chikli will be able to run in one of the existing parties on the condition that he resigns from the Knesset. This was only the second time such proceedings had been used against an MK who had not retired independently, with Chikli only the third Knesset member to be declared a retiree. Chikli resigned from the Knesset in July 2022 to run on the Likud list in the 2022 legislative election, and was given the list's 14th spot.

In the petition submitted by the Meretz party to the election committee, a request was made to prevent the placement of Chikli on the Likud list in light of the suspicion of violating the election law in that Chikli resigned from the Knesset only a few months after announcing his withdrawal from his party. Judge Yitzhak Amit, chairman of the Central Election Committee, accepted the petition and declared that Chikli would not be able to run on the Likud list. In response, Likud claimed that it would petition the Supreme Court to annul the decision of the chairman of the elections. Meretz agreed with the decision to disqualify Chikli. The Supreme Court overturned his disqualification on 9 October. He was subsequently elected to the Knesset and sworn in on 29 December, before resigning on 17 January 2023 under the Norwegian Law.

Political positions 
In 2023, he stated that the Palestinian Authority is a "neo-Nazi entity" and that it is necessary to "examine alternatives to its existence".

He accuses former Prime Minister Yair Lapid of "spearheading" BDS movement (Boycott, Divestment and Sanctions), because of the latter's criticism of Itamar Ben-Gvir.

References

External links

1981 births
Living people
People from Jerusalem
Israeli soldiers
Tel Aviv University alumni
Likud politicians
New Right (Israel) politicians
Yamina politicians
Members of the 24th Knesset (2021–2022)
Members of the 25th Knesset (2022–)
Israeli people of Tunisian-Jewish descent
Jewish Israeli politicians